The AK-105 is a shortened carbine version of the AK-74M rifle, which in turn was derived from the original AK-47 design and its successor, the AK-74. It's chambered to fire 5.45×39mm ammunition.

Design
Compared to the AK-74M, AK-101, and AK-103, which are full-size assault rifles of similar design, the AK-102, 104, and 105 feature shortened barrels that make them a middle ground between a full rifle and the more compact AKS-74U. However, the AK-105 also features a solid, side-folding polymer stock, unlike the shorter, skeleton-stocked AKS-74U. The front sight is a post adjustable for elevation in the field. Horizontal adjustment is done by the armory before issue. The AK-105 has a muzzle booster derived from the AKS-74U.

Protective coatings ensure excellent corrosion resistance of metal parts. Forearm, magazine, butt stock and pistol grip are made of high strength plastic. The weapon is equipped with a flash hider.

The 100-series AKs are produced by the Izhmash factories in Izhevsk, Russia.

Users

: Used by the State Border Service.
: Used by Namibian Marine Corps
: Used by some units of the Ministry of Internal Affairs and other law enforcement. It is also in limited service with the Russian army.
: Used by some Syrian special forces.

References

External links

 Izhmash Weapons Are Always Up-To-Date
 Modern Firearms page

5.45×39mm assault rifles
Kalashnikov derivatives
Assault rifles of Russia
Carbines
Kalashnikov Concern products
Military equipment introduced in the 1990s